Heliocheilus aberrans is a moth in the family Noctuidae. It is found in the Australian Capital Territory, New South Wales, Northern Territory, Queensland, Victoria and Western Australia.

External links
Australian Caterpillars
Australian Faunal Directory

Heliocheilus
Moths of Australia

Moths described in 1886